Secutor hanedai is a species of marine ray-finned fish, a ponyfish from the family Leiognathidae. It isnative to the Indian and Pacific ocean waters around the countries of Thailand, Indonesia and Malaysia.  It can be found in marine and brackish waters.  This species can reach a length of  SL. The specific name honours Yata Haneda (1907-1995), a Japanese biologist who studied bioluminescent organisms, including ponyfishes.

References  

Fish described in 1989
hanedai
Bioluminescent fish